Kristie Marsden (born ) is a Canadian actress from British Columbia.

Career
Marsden was the youngest Canadian actress to play the role of Sophie in the touring edition of the Broadway musical Mamma Mia! She played the role for 832 performances.

She has also guest starred on numerous television shows, such as The 4400, Psych, Supernatural, Saved, Masters Of Horror, Dark Angel and many more. She made her feature film debut in 2005, in the Warner Bros. picture The Sisterhood of the Traveling Pants. Marsden has also been heard as a voiceover actress on various cartoon and anime shows, such as Fraw Bow in Mobile Suit Gundam, Mary Kate and Ashley in Action and Alienators: Evolution Continues. She played the regular role of Erin on The N network's 2007 comedy series About A Girl.

Filmography

Film
 The Sisterhood of the Traveling Pants (2005) — Olivia

Television
 Blind Date (2001)
 Dark Angel (2001)
 2Gether (2001)
 Freedom (2001)
 These Arms of Mine (2001)
 Animal Miracles (2001)
 The Chris Isaak Show (2001)
 Wolf Lake (2001)
 Maybe It's Me (2001) (episode: "The Pilot Episode")
 Strange Frequency (2001)
 I Was A Teenage Faust (2002)
 Just Deal (2002)
 Beyond Belief: Fact or Fiction (2002)
 Brainfart (2004)
 Reefer Madness (2005)
 Supernatural (2005)
 Masters Of Horror (2006)
 Saved (2006)
 Psych (2007)
 The 4400 (2007)
 About a Girl (2007) (main role)

Voiceover/Anime
 Mobile Suit Gundam (2001)
 Mary-Kate and Ashley in Action! (2001)
 Alienators: Evolution Continues (2001)
 Mobile Suit Gundam for PS3 (2006)
 The Girl Who Leapt Through Time (2009)
 Iron Man: Armored Adventures (2012)
 The Little Prince (2015) as Onyx (episodes 11–12, "The Planet of Jade")

Theatre
 Mamma Mia! (2002–2004)
 The Music Man Fiddler on the Roof 
 The Wizard of Oz 
 Somewhere in the World 
 Pelagie 
 Caledonia 
 The King & I 
 Anne of Green Gables Oklahoma! 
 Oliver! 
 Joseph and the Amazing Technicolor Dreamcoat''

References

External links

1982 births
Living people
Actresses from British Columbia
Canadian film actresses
Canadian musical theatre actresses
Canadian television actresses
Canadian voice actresses
People from Burnaby
21st-century Canadian actresses